The Portland Fighting Shockwave is a women's professional football team competing in the Women's Football Alliance.  The team is based in Portland, Oregon, and plays their home games at Hillsboro Stadium in nearby Hillsboro. They are the longest running women's semi-professional team in the Portland metropolitan area.

History
For the 2005 season the Shockwave played their home games at Lincoln High School in Portland. During their fifth season in 2006, the team won the Pacific Northwest Division for the first time and made the Independent Women's Football League (IWFL) playoffs for the first time.

Season-by-season statistics

|-
| colspan="6" align="center" | Oregon Thunder (IWFL)
|-
|2002 || 0 || 8 || 0 || T-6th Western Division || --
|-
| colspan="6" align="center" | Portland Shockwave (IWFL)
|-
|2003 || 5 || 3 || 1 || 3rd WC Pacific Northwest || --
|-
|2004 || 3 || 5 || 0 || 3rd WC Pacific Northwest || --
|-
|2005 || 3 || 5 || 0 || 3rd WC Pacific Northwest || --
|-
|2006 || 7 || 1 || 0 || 1st WC Pacific Northwest || Lost Western Conference Qualifier (Sacramento)
|-
|2007 || 6 || 2 || 0 || 2nd WC Pacific Northwest || --
|-
|2008 || 5 || 3 || 0 || 3rd Tier I WC Pacific Northwest || --
|-
|2009 || 4 || 4 || 0 || 2nd Tier I WC Pacific Northwest || --
|-
|2010 || 6 || 2 || 0 || 3rd Tier I WC Pacific West || --
|-
|2011 || 8 || 0 || 0 || 1st Tier I WC Pacific Northwest || Lost Western Conference Qualifier (Wisconsin Warriors)
|-
|2012 || 3 || 5 || 0 || 1st Tier II Pacific Northwest || Won Founders  Bowl Quarterfinal (California)Won Founders Bowl Semifinal (Madison)Lost Founders Bowl Championship (Carolina)
|-
| colspan="6" align="center" | Portland Shockwave (WFA)
|-
|2013 || 5 || 3 || 0 || American Conference Div-11 || --
|-
|2014 || 6 || 2 || 0 || American Conference Div-11 || --
|-
!Totals || 63 || 46 || 1
|colspan="2"| (including playoffs)

Season schedules

2009

** = Won by forfeit

2010

2013

2014

References

External links
Portland Shockwave official site
Independent Women's Football League official site

2002 establishments in Oregon
Independent Women's Football League
American football teams established in 2002
Sports in Hillsboro
Sports in Vancouver, Washington
Shockwave
Women's sports in Oregon